
Lubartów County is a unit of territorial administration and local government (powiat) in Lublin Voivodeship, eastern Poland. It was established on January 1, 1999, as a result of the Polish local government reforms passed in 1998.

As of 2019, its total population is 88,591, out of which the population of Lubartów is 21,948, that of Kock is 3,293, that of Ostrów Lubelski is 2,078, and the rural population is 61,272.

Neighbouring counties
Lubartów County is bordered by Łuków County and Radzyń Podlaski County to the north, Parczew County to the north-east, Łęczna County to the south-east, Lublin County to the south, and Puławy County and Ryki County to the west.

Administrative division
The county is subdivided into 13 gminas (one urban, two urban-rural and 10 rural). These are listed in the following table, in descending order of population.

References

 
Land counties of Lublin Voivodeship